Sterling Johnson Jr. (May 14, 1934 – October 10, 2022) was a United States district judge of the United States District Court for the Eastern District of New York. Before his appointment to the bench in 1991, Johnson was an attorney for 25 years, specializing in drug enforcement and the prosecution of narcotics cases. As Special Narcotics Prosecutor for the City of New York, he supervised assistant district attorneys and investigators responsible for the preparation and prosecution of more than 7,000 criminal cases. He has been a guest lecturer at many American universities and law schools, as well as in various countries.

Education and career

Johnson was born in Brooklyn, New York City. He received a Bachelor of Arts degree from Brooklyn College in 1963. He received a Bachelor of Laws from Brooklyn Law School in 1966. He was in the United States Marine Corps from 1952 to 1955. 

Johnson was a police officer of the New York City Police Department from 1956 to 1967. He was an Assistant United States Attorney of the Southern District of New York from 1967 to 1970. He was the executive director of the Civilian Complaint Review Board of the New York City Police Department from 1970 to 1974. He was an executive liaison officer of the United States Drug Enforcement Administration from 1974 to 1975. He was a special narcotics prosecutor for New York City from 1975 to 1991. He was a Commissioner of the United States Sentencing Commission from 1999 to 2003.

Federal judicial service
Johnson was nominated by President George H. W. Bush on May 17, 1991, to a seat on the United States District Court for the Eastern District of New York vacated by Judge Joseph M. McLaughlin. He was confirmed by the United States Senate on June 27, 1991, and received commission on July 2, 1991. He assumed senior status on June 1, 2003. Johnson died on October 10, 2022, aged 88.

Other service
Johnson was a founding member of NOBLE, a national organization of African American police officers.

See also 
 List of African-American federal judges
 List of African-American jurists

References

External links

 Official biography
NOBLE National 

1934 births
2022 deaths
20th-century American judges
21st-century American judges
African-American judges
African-American police officers
Assistant United States Attorneys
Brooklyn College alumni
Brooklyn Law School alumni
Judges of the United States District Court for the Eastern District of New York
Members of the United States Sentencing Commission
Military personnel from New York City
New York City Police Department officers
United States district court judges appointed by George H. W. Bush
United States Marines
United States Navy officers